Eugoa sordida is a moth of the family Erebidae first described by Walter Rothschild in 1913. It is found in New Guinea.

References

sordida
Moths described in 1913